Campares is a deserted locality located in the municipality of Sabiñánigo, in Huesca province, Aragon, Spain. As of 2020, it has a population of 0.

Geography 
Campares is located 47km north of Huesca.

References

Populated places in the Province of Huesca